The funnel–mantle locking apparatus is a structure found in many cephalopods that connects the mantle and hyponome (funnel) and restricts their movement relative to each other. It consists of two interlocking components: one located on the mantle (often fibrous) and the other on the funnel (often cartilaginous). The apparatus may permit some anterior–posterior displacement or prevent movement altogether.

Function

Variability

Funnel component
Six major forms of the funnel locking apparatus are recognised among teuthids (lazy-T shape, inverted-T shape, straight shape, triangular shape, oval with tragus and/or antitragus, and oval shape) and several more are found in the sepioids (including the boomerang shape and keyhole shape).

Mantle component

References

Cephalopod zootomy